Zoltán Horusitzky (18 July 1903 in Pápa – 25 April 1985 in Budapest) was a Hungarian composer. A pupil of Kodály, from 1938 Horusitzky was editor of A zene, a journal promoting the Magyar Korus movement.

Recordings
Zoltán Horusitzky: North - chamber cantata, Op. 70 ; Four Songs, Op. 8 ; New Songs, Op. 59 ; The Power of Music, Op. 73 ; Three Songs, Op. 7 ; Cello Sonata, Op. 71 ; Attila Fülöp (tenor), Jutta Bokor (mezzo-soprano), Kolos Kováts (bass), Tamás Salgó (piano), Zoltán Horusitzky (piano), Erika Lux (piano) Chorus of the Hungarian State Folk Ensemble, Chorus Vox Humana, Vác, Gergely Ménesi Hungaroton - HCD32263
Horusitzky: Piano Sonata, Op. 45 'La Montagne',  Chinese Songs, Op. 13 ; Three Sonnets by Shakespeare ; French Songs Op. 58 ; Sonata for Two Pianos, Op. 51 1940, piano piece, Op. 12 No. 2 ; Margit László (soprano), Boldizsár Keönch (tenor), Zoltán Horusitzky, Imre Rohmann, Ferenc Rõczey Sr., Ferenc Rõczey Jr. (pianos) Hungaroton - HCD31670

References

1903 births
1985 deaths
Hungarian composers
Hungarian male composers
20th-century Hungarian male musicians